Ela Orleans (born 1971 in Oświęcim, commonly known by its German name of Auschwitz) is a Polish composer, multi-instrumentalist and singer. Orleans uses electronic and acoustic instruments (including synthesisers, guitar, violin, piano) to create a diverse and layered music. She performs as both a musician and DJ (the latter often under the alias Tract). Her work as a songwriter in many instances uses 1950s and 1960s pop as its basis, by way of everything from electronica to Éthiopiques (the CD series of 1960s and 1970s Ethiopian music), from Polish folk to Bernard Herrmann's film scores for Alfred Hitchcock.

Orleans is based in London, after years in New York, Warsaw and Glasgow. Various independent labels around the world since 2008 have released her solo studio albums, as well as compilations, mixes and collaborations with artists such as Dirty Beaches, U.S. Girls and The Pastels. Orleans has scored music for TV, film, and opera. She has toured and made festival appearances across the UK, Europe and North America. She has played live and had her work presented internationally in galleries such as Tate Britain.

Orleans describes her music as "movies for ears". She consistently receives international acclaim from the fringe, art and mainstream worlds. Q magazine acknowledges Ela Orleans' "prolific track record on the fringes of experimental music, both as a sound collagist and film composer" (May 2015). Uncut magazine has lauded Ela Orleans for her "beautifully confusing solo albums" (October 2013). The Wire magazine asserted that Orleans' "spectral pop enchants and disturbs, revealing new secrets with each listen" (September 2016). Thurston Moore in the Mojo magazine review of 2014 remarked on Ela Orleans' "astounding soundscapes, though it's her beautiful voice that really galvanises the music. … The best thing I've heard all year." Other noted supporters of Orleans' music include film director Miranda July, the late DJ Andrew Weatherall, singer-songwriter Tim Burgess, director David Lynch, author Ian Rankin and indie group The Pastels.

Life and career 
Ela Orleans graduated from the National College of Fine Arts in Bielsko-Biala, Poland, in 1991. She completed her master's degree at the Aleksander Zelwerowicz National Academy of Dramatic Art in Warsaw, in 1997. That same year, Orleans moved to Glasgow and, under the name Lizzy Swimmers, joined collage-pop group Hassle Hound.

Ela Orleans returned to Warsaw in 2000. She continued to work with Hassle Hound, collaborated with German composer Marcus Schmickler and also began to create solo material. The UK indie Pickled Egg Records released Scaring the Grass in the Garden, the debut album from Hassle Hound, in 2002. The next year, experimental French label Textile Records released a split EP with Hassle Hound and the Australian duo Sun, comprising multi-instrumentalist Oren Ambarchi and composer Chris Townsend.

Orleans moved to New York in 2004, where she played with experimental group Jackie-O Motherfucker, jazz drummer Kevin Shea, and collaborated with various noise artists. Twisted Nerve, the label founded by indie singer-songwriter Badly Drawn Boy and musician-DJ Andy Votel, that year issued "Appalachian Listening Post", a Hassle Hound single, and in 2006 the electronic music label Staubgold put out their second album, Limelight Cordial. Hassle Hound split up in 2008, and Orleans began to release her solo work. Italian indie Setola Di Maiale issued the debut Ela Orleans album, Low Sun, High Moon, and in 2009 France's La Station Radar put out the vinyl release Lost. This year also saw Ela Orleans win two mentorships. Orleans worked under the aegis of composer David Shire, known for soundtracks including The Taking of Pelham One Two Three, Francis Ford Coppola's The Conversation, and All the President's Men, after Broadcast Music, Inc. (BMI), the United States performing rights organisation, chose her for its film scoring mentorship program. The New York Foundation for the Arts (NYFA) in addition paired Orleans with Viennese composer Lukas Ligeti after it selected her for its Immigrant Artist Mentoring Program. Ela Orleans began an ongoing collaboration in 2010 as composer for TVP1 and TVP Kultura, respectively the prime and arts channels of Poland's largest television network. A further Hassle Hound album, Born in a Night, also appeared this year.

Double Feature, a split album with electro-rockabilly artist Dirty Beaches (real name Alex Zhang Hungtai), came out in 2011 (on Night People in the US and La Station Radar in France), as did the third full Ela Orleans album, Mars Is Heaven (jointly released by the French labels La Station Radar and Atelier Ciseaux), and NEO PI-R, a compilation of four-track recordings on Clan Destine Records. The Massachusetts Museum of Contemporary Art (MASS MoCA) included the Ela Orleans piece "Amsler Grid" in its exhibition An Exchange with Sol LeWitt, a celebration of the conceptual artist LeWitt's creative relationships. This year also saw Orleans move back to Glasgow, and the next saw the release of Statement, a split album with Dirty Beaches, art-rock performer Slim Twig (real name Max Turnbull) and the indie-electronica group based around Meghan Remy, U.S. Girls. Orleans in addition released 80 Minutes of Funk in 2012, a split cassette with Curt Crackrach (née Dafydd McKaharay, a fellow proponent of the so-called "witch house" or horror-film/occult electronica music genre). Orleans also collaborated on several occasions with Skitter (real name Liam Stefani and described by Rough Trade as a "one-man noise puzzlist") on drone soundscapes, which culminated in 2013's De fléchettes. The song "Light in Extension", released under the name Tract, an experimental acid-techno alter ego of Ela Orleans, appeared on the Clan Destine compilation Dark Acid III. Ela Orleans' double album Tumult in Clouds meanwhile beat nominees including Hookworms, Broadcast and My Bloody Valentine to win the Mercury Prize alternative, the inaugural Dead Albatross Music Prize.

Orleans remixed "Kalimba" (originally from the Brian Eno album Music for Films III on the All Saints label) by ambient musician Laraaji in 2014, as part of a Warp Records project to revive the All Saints catalogue. Swedish director-artist Maja Borg together with Dazed & Confused, meanwhile, produced Borg's short film We the Others and commissioned Orleans to provide the soundtrack. Orleans also took up residency at the École nationale supérieure d'art de Bourges, France, to score a soundtrack for Architecture of an Atom, a feature film directed by cartoonist-filmmaker Juliacks (real name Julia Stein) and screened in various international contemporary art museums. Orleans undertook a further residency at the Warsaw Chamber Opera theatre to compose the music for Wieza (Tower), an opera directed by artist Karolina Bregula and commissioned by the Polish foundation Witryna Kultury.

Howie B (full name Howard Bernstein) produced the next Ela Orleans album, Upper Hell, and released it on his HB Records label in 2015. Orleans also accepted a commission from the Glasgow Women's Library to score the feature-length documentary March, by Royal Conservatoire of Scotland lecturer Anna Birch and editor Marissa Keating. Orleans subsequently took an artist-in-residence position at the Elektronmusikstudion (EMS, or Electroacoustic Music in Sweden), the national centre for Swedish electroacoustic music and sound-art based in Stockholm, to complete a commission for the soundtrack to Man, another Maja Borg film. Bristol band Spectres released a duet between frontman Joe Hatt and Ela Orleans, "Spectre", as an unofficial theme song for the James Bond film Spectre and rival to "Writing's on the Wall" by Sam Smith.

The Glasgow Film Festival appointed Ela Orleans in 2016 to write and perform a score for the 1929 silent film Lucky Star, directed by Frank Borzage. The Glasgow International Festival in turn commissioned Orleans to write a score for the classic 1932 film Vampyr, directed by Carl Theodor Dreyer. The original, unexpurgated vision of Upper Hell appeared as the double album Circles of Upper and Lower Hell (on Glasgow's Night School Records), and Orleans was again nominated for the Dead Albatross Music Prize. The album featured lyrics taken from Arthur Rimbaud, Dante's Divine Comedy and an early 20th-century poem by Sara Teasdale. Stephen Pastel (Stephen McRobbie) and Katrina Mitchell of The Pastels contributed vocals to the song "You Go Through Me".

Discography

Hassle Hound 
 Scaring the Grass in the Garden (2002, Pickled Egg)
 Sun & Hassle Hound (2003, Textile; split with Sun) 
 "Appalachian Listening Post" (2004, Twisted Nerve; single)
 Limelight Cordial (2006, Staubgold)
 Born in a Night (2010, Staubgold)

Ela Orleans solo
 Low Sun, High Moon (2008, Setola Di Maiale)
 Ahata/Anahata (2009, La Station Radar; collaboration with Skitter)
 Lost (2009, La Station Radar)
 The Strongest Walls Open as I Pass (2010, La Station Radar; collaboration with Skitter)
 Double Feature (2011, Night People, La Station Radar; split with Dirty Beaches)
 Mars Is Heaven (2011, La Station Radar, Atelier Ciseaux)
 NEO PI-R (2011, Clan Destine; compilation)
 Statement (2012, Clan Destine; split with Slim Twig, Dirty Beaches, U.S. Girls)
 80 Minutes of Funk (2012, Clan Destine; (split with Curt Crackrach)
 De fléchettes (2013, Clan Destine; collaboration with Skitter)
 Tumult in Clouds (2013, Clan Destine; double album)
 Upper Hell (2015, HB)
 Circles of Upper and Lower Hell (2016, Night School; double album)
 Movies for Ears (2019, Night School; compilation)

References

External links 
 Official website
 
 

Living people
Polish composers
Polish DJs
Polish electronic musicians
Polish expatriates in Scotland
Polish expatriates in the United Kingdom
Polish expatriates in the United States
Polish songwriters
People from Oświęcim
1971 births
Electronic dance music DJs
Polish women composers